Presidential Palace  is a palace  located in Nouakchott, Mauritania. It is located on the Avenue Gamal Abdel Nasser, between the Friday Mosque of Nouakchott and the headquarters of Air Mauritania.

References

Palaces in Mauritania
Buildings and structures in Nouakchott
Government of Mauritania